"It's All Been Done" is a song by Canadian alternative rock group Barenaked Ladies. It was released as the second single from their 1998 album, Stunt. The song was successful in Canada, peaking at  1 on the RPM Top Singles chart and becoming the band's highest-charting song in their native country. The song was used as the theme song for the television series Baby Blues. The song is also notable for being one of the band's first to feature an electric guitar solo by Ed Robertson.

Music video
The video was directed by Doug Aitken and was filmed in the former house of comedian Andrew Dice Clay. The concept of the video was that it was seen from the point of view of various household pets (a cat, a dog, a goldfish, and a bird). Robertson and Page were disappointed with the filming of the video while it was being shot, as they did not feel it was capturing the feeling of the concept.

The video features a bald Kevin Hearn, as he was undergoing chemotherapy. He plays a Hohner Clavinet.

Performances
The band performed the song on Saturday Night Live, Late Night with Conan O'Brien and The Tonight Show with Jay Leno. On The Tonight Show, actor David Duchovny, who had appeared as a guest earlier in the program, joined the band for the song in the musical segment, playing an egg shaker. The band had arranged it with the actor after an impromptu meeting a week earlier while shooting a television guest appearance at a studio lot.

Track listings
Australian CD single
 "It's All Been Done" (album version) – 3:26
 "One Week" (Pull's Break Remix) – 3:21
 "Brian Wilson" (live) – 4:40

UK CD single
 "It's All Been Done" (album version) – 3:27
 "Brian Wilson" (live from Rock Spectacle) – 4:46
 "The Old Apartment" (live from Rock Spectacle) – 3:21

UK cassette single
 "It's All Been Done" (album version) – 3:27
 "Brian Wilson" (live from Rock Spectacle) – 4:46

Personnel
 Steven Page – lead vocals, acoustic and electric guitars
 Ed Robertson – acoustic and electric guitars, backing vocals
 Jim Creeggan – electric bass, backing vocals
 Kevin Hearn – keyboards, backing vocals
 Tyler Stewart – drums, percussion, backing vocals
 Natasha Hébert – "Parlez Français"
 Tom Lord-Alge – mixing

Charts

Weekly charts

Year-end charts

Release history

References

1998 singles
1998 songs
Barenaked Ladies songs
Reprise Records singles
RPM Top Singles number-one singles
Songs written by Steven Page
Animated series theme songs